The cownose ray (Rhinoptera bonasus) is a species of Batoidea found throughout a large part of the western Atlantic and Caribbean, from New England, United States to southern Brazil (the East Atlantic populations are now generally considered a separate species, the Lusitanian cownose ray (R. marginata)). Male rays often reach about 2 and 1/2 feet in width. Females typically reach about 3 feet in width. However, there have been reports of rays up to 7 feet in width. Sizes change depending on the geographical range. Females will usually grow larger than males, allowing for larger offspring. These rays also belong to the order Myliobatiformes, a group that is shared by bat rays, manta rays, and eagle rays.

In 2019, the species was listed as vulnerable on the IUCN Red List.

Taxonomy 
The genus name Rhinoptera is named for the Ancient Greek words for nose (rhinos) and wing (pteron). The species name bonasus comes from the Ancient Greek for bison (bonasos).

Description 
There is some controversy over the size that a mature cownose ray can reach. A ray reaching a span of  has been recorded. The cownose ray is often mistaken for being a shark by beach-goers. This is due to the tips of the rays fins sticking out of the water, often resembling the dorsal fin of a shark.

A cownose ray is typically brown-backed with a whitish or yellowish belly. Although its coloration is not particularly distinctive, its shape is easily recognizable. It has a broad head with wide-set eyes, and a pair of distinctive lobes on its subrostral fin. It also has a set of dental plates designed for crushing clams and oyster shells. When threatened the cownose ray can use the barb at the base of its tail to defend itself from the threat.

A cownose ray has a spine with a toxin, close to the ray's body. This spine has teeth lining its lateral edges, and is coated with a weak venom that causes symptoms similar to that of a bee sting.

Behavior

Diet and feeding 
The cownose ray feeds upon clams, oysters, hard clams, crabs, lobsters and other invertebrates, as well as bony fish. It uses two modified fins on its front side to produce suction, which allows it to draw food into its mouth, where it crushes its food with its dental plates. Cownose rays typically swim in groups, which allows them to use their synchronized wing flaps to stir up sediment and expose buried clams and oysters.

The cownose ray prefers to feed either in the early morning hours, or in the late afternoon hours; when the waves are calm and visibility is higher than during the day. The cownose ray has a jaw that reflects its diet of: benthic bivalve mollusks, crustaceans, and polychaetes. Their jaws are extremely robust and have teeth with a hardness comparable to that of cement, allowing them to eat hard shells.  The feeding habits of cownose rays is cause for increasing concern, as they are known for destroying oyster beds that are already being destroyed largely by human pollution. The cownose rays destruction of large oyster beds only further puts oyster beds at risk.

Predation 
The cownose ray sits fairly high up on the food chain, and as a result only has a few natural predators. These predators include; cobia, hammerhead sharks, and humans who like to fish for them.

Reproduction and lifespan 
Sexual maturity for both males and females is reached around 4 to 5 years of age. In the Gulf of Mexico, females live up to 18 years, and males only live up to 16 years.

Cownose rays breed from April through October. A large school of cownose rays gather of varying ages and sexes in shallow waters. A female will swim with the edges of her pectoral fins sticking out of the water, with male cownose rays following her trying to grasp the fins to mate.

The embryo grows within its mother with its wings folded over its body. Initially it is nourished by an egg yolk, although the uterine secretions of the mother nourish it later in its development. The length of gestation is disputed, but it is believed to last between 11 and 12 months and is variable. At full term, the offspring are born live, exiting tail first.

Migration 
The cownose ray often migrates from the Gulf of Mexico to Trinidad, Venezuela, and Brazil. The Atlantic migration pattern consists of the cownose rays moving north in late Spring and moving south in late Fall.

Migration may be influenced by water temperature and sun orientation, which explains the seasonal migration pattern. Southern migration may be influenced by solar orientation and Northern migration may be influenced by the change in water temperature.

It is unknown whether their migratory behavior is due to feeding or premigratory mating activity.

The cownose ray is also present in areas such as Maryland and Virginia, and can be seen migrating and schooling, as it is not uncommon for them to swim near the surface, despite feeding mostly on the bottom. These schools can be seen and migration tracked via airplane as it is easy to see the schools from the sky. However, while the migration patterns can tracked, the exact reason for migration is currently unknown.

The cownose ray has recently been spotted in the inland waters of the mid Atlantic island of Bermuda.

Habitat and Distribution
They are located from Southern New England to Northern Florida in the United States, as well as throughout the Gulf of Mexico, Trinidad, Venezuela, and Brazil.

They are social creatures and migrate extremely long distances, often traveling in schools.

Conservation status 
The cownose ray is currently listed as vulnerable by the IUCN Red List due to extensive overfishing in the Caribbean. It is less threatened in the Gulf of Mexico and along the Atlantic coast of North America, but the species overall has still experienced steep population declines of 30–49% in only 43 years. Cownose ray killing contests have been banned in the state of Maryland.

Relationship to humans

Risk to humans 
Stingrays, including the cownose ray, can pose a low to moderate risk to humans. Rays will lash their tails when threatened, posing a risk of being whipped. If threatened, the cownose ray can also use their barb as a weapon to sting the aggressor. A sting from a cownose ray can cause a very painful wound that requires medical attention once stung. While the sting is not usually fatal, it can be fatal if stung in the abdomen. There is also a risk associated with eating meat from the sea animal that has not been prepared correctly. Shigella may be acquired from eating meat from a cownose ray that has been contaminated with the bacteria. This bacteria causes shigellosis, and can result in dysentery. Symptoms can include diarrhea, pain, fever, and possible dehydration.

Fishing 
One solution to the cownose rays' destruction of oyster beds, as well as their overpopulation in certain areas, is to open the ray up for commercial fishing. However, since the means to fish them are difficult and expensive to obtain, and the meat of the rays has very little demand, this solution would most likely prove to be too expensive and yield too little of a profit for it to be a viable venture for any commercial fishermen. It is, however, often caught by hobby fishermen. In the Caribbean and along the Venezuelan coast, the ray is heavily overfished leading to declines of up to 49% of the population in the last 43 years.

Aquariums 
Cownose rays can be seen in many public aquaria worldwide and are often featured in special 'touch tanks' where visitors can reach into a wide but shallow pool containing the fish, which have often had their barbs pinched or taken off (they eventually regrow, similar to human nails), making them safe enough to touch.

The following aquariums and zoos are known to have touch tanks featuring cownose rays (alone or with other fish):

USA 
 Adventure Aquarium in Camden, New Jersey
 Albuquerque Aquarium in Albuquerque, New Mexico
 Audubon Aquarium in New Orleans, Louisiana
 Arizona-Sonora Desert Museum in Tucson, Arizona
 Atlantic City Aquarium in Atlantic City, New Jersey
 Aquarium of the Pacific in Long Beach, California
 Butterfly House and Aquarium in Sioux Falls, South Dakota
 California Academy of Sciences in San Francisco, California
 Children's Aquarium at Fair Park in Dallas, Texas
 Clearwater Marine Aquarium in Clearwater, Florida
 Columbus Zoo and Aquarium in Powell, Ohio
 Downtown Aquarium, Denver in Denver, Colorado
 The Florida Aquarium in Tampa, Florida
 Fresno Chaffee Zoo in Fresno, California
 Georgia Aquarium in Atlanta, Georgia
 Gulf World Marine Park in Panama City Beach, Florida
 Henry Doorly Zoo in Omaha, Nebraska 
 Indianapolis Zoo in Indianapolis, Indiana
 Jacksonville Zoo and Gardens in Jacksonville, Florida
 Kansas City Zoo in Kansas City, Missouri
 Living Shores Aquarium in Glen, New Hampshire
 Long Island Aquarium and Exhibition Center in Riverhead, New York
 Lowry Park Zoo in Tampa, Florida
 Marine Science Center in Ponce Inlet, Florida
 Maritime Aquarium in Norwalk, Connecticut
 Memphis Zoo and Aquarium in Memphis, Tennessee
 Mississippi Aquarium in Gulfport, Mississippi
 Mystic Aquarium in Mystic, Connecticut 
 National Mississippi River Museum & Aquarium in Dubuque, Iowa
 The New England Aquarium in Boston, Massachusetts
 New York Aquarium in Brooklyn, New York
 Newport Aquarium in Newport, Kentucky
 North Carolina Aquarium at Pine Knoll Shores in Emerald Isle, North Carolina
 Ocean Adventures in Gulfport, Mississippi 
 OdySea Aquarium in Scottsdale, Arizona 
 Oklahoma City Zoo and Botanical Garden in Oklahoma City, Oklahoma
 Phoenix Zoo in Phoenix, Arizona
 Rooster Cogburn Ostrich Ranch in Picacho, Arizona
  
 Ripley's Aquarium of Myrtle Beach in Myrtle Beach, South Carolina
 Ripley’s Aquarium of the Smokies in Gatlinburg, Tennessee

 Saint Louis Zoo in St. Louis, Missouri
 San Antonio Aquarium in San Antonio, Texas
 SeaWorld Orlando in Orlando, Florida
 Shedd Aquarium in Chicago, Illinois 
 Shreveport Aquarium in Shreveport, Louisiana 
 Tennessee Aquarium in Chattanooga, Tennessee
 Texas State Aquarium in Corpus Christi, Texas
 Toledo Zoo in Toledo, Ohio
 Tropicana Field in St. Petersburg, Florida
 Turtle Back Zoo in West Orange, New Jersey
Wonders of Wildlife Museum & Aquarium in Springfield, Missouri 
ViaAquarium in Rotterdam, New York
 Virginia Aquarium in Virginia Beach, Virginia
 Greensboro Science Center in Greensboro, North Carolina

Canada 
 Aquarium of Quebec in Quebec City
 Granby Zoo in Granby
 Ripley's Aquarium of Canada in Toronto, Ontario
 The Vancouver Aquarium in Vancouver, British Columbia
 Assiniboine Park Zoo in Winnipeg, Manitoba

References

  Database entry includes a lengthy justification of why this species is near threatened.
 
 Florida Museum of Natural History Ichthyology Dept: Cownose Rays

cownose ray
Ovoviviparous fish
Fish of the Eastern United States
Fish of the Western Atlantic
cownose ray